Cosmia calami, the American dun-bar moth, is a moth in the family Noctuidae. It is found in North America, including California, Georgia, Massachusetts, Minnesota, New Hampshire, New Jersey, Oregon, Pennsylvania, Tennessee, Washington and Wisconsin.

The forewings are pale yellow to light brown with small discal spots. The hindwings are white. Adults are on wing in midsummer.

The larvae are carnivorous and feed on geometrid caterpillars that feed on Quercus species.

References

Moths described in 1876
Cosmia
Moths of North America